Thomas Gordon William Ashbourne (December 4, 1894 – March 8, 1984) was a Canadian politician who was part of the Newfoundland National Convention which discussed the terms of union between Newfoundland and Canada.

Early life
Born in Twillingate, Newfoundland, he was classmates with Lester Pearson while attending Victoria College, University of Toronto. After graduating in 1917, he joined the Canadian Army but was later not allowed to fight due to an irregular heartbeat. He fought instead with the British Army in Flanders from 1917 to 1918.

Politics
In 1923, he was elected to the Newfoundland and Labrador House of Assembly for Twillingate and was re-elected 1924.

In 1947, he was elected to the Newfoundland National Convention for Twillingate. He also visited Parliament Hill with the Ottawa Delegation to negotiate the Terms of Union for Confederation with Canada.

The delegation's members (With their districts) were:     
 T.G.W. Ashbourne (Twillingate)
 F.G. Bradley (Bonavista South)
 Charles Ballam (Humber)
 Lester Burry (Labrador)
 P.W. Crummey (Bay de Verde)
 Joey Smallwood (Bonavista Centre)

Post-Confederation
After Confederation, Ashbourne was elected to the House of Commons of Canada for the riding of Grand Falls—White Bay in 1949. A Liberal, he was re-elected in 1953 and 1957.

References

External links
 

1894 births
1984 deaths
Liberal Party of Canada MPs
Members of the House of Commons of Canada from Newfoundland and Labrador
Liberal Party of Newfoundland and Labrador MHAs
Newfoundland National Convention members
University of Toronto alumni
Dominion of Newfoundland expatriates in Canada